Kim R. Schroeder (born July 1957) is a Judge of the Kansas Court of Appeals.

Early life and education

Schroeder earned an Associate of Arts degree from Seward County Community College in Liberal, Kansas, in 1977 and a Bachelor of Arts from Washburn University in 1979. He received his Juris Doctor from Washburn University School of Law in 1982.

Legal career and state judicial career

He began his legal career in 1982 with the Hugoton law firm of Brollier & Wolf, where he became a partner in 1984. In 1998 he was elected judge of the 26th Judicial District Court. Schroeder remained on the district court bench until his appointment to the Kansas Court of Appeals in 2013.

Appointment to Kansas  Court of Appeals

He was appointed to the court by Governor Sam Brownback on January 12, 2013. He was retained by voters in 2014 for a four-year term that ends January 13, 2019.

Personal

Schroeder and his wife, Karolyn, have been married for more than 35 years. They have two adult children, a son who died in 2007, and a daughter who is a registered nurse in Shawnee, where she resides with her family.

References

External links
Official Biography on Kansas Judicial Branch website

Living people
1957 births
20th-century American judges
20th-century American lawyers
21st-century American judges
Kansas Court of Appeals Judges
Kansas lawyers
Kansas state court judges
People from Winfield, Kansas
Washburn University alumni